University Press of Southern Denmark is Denmark's largest university press and was founded in 1966 as Odense University Press (Odense Universitetsforlag). The press publishes books from the world of science in the broadest sense of the word. Its authors are mainly academics from the University of Southern Denmark and from Denmark's other centres of higher education. The University Press of Southern Denmark also publishes a wide range of textbooks and teaching materials, as well as periodicals.

External links
University Press of Southern Denmark website

Publishing companies of Denmark
Danish companies established in 1966
Publishing companies established in 1966
University presses of Denmark
Mass media in Odense
1966 establishments in Denmark
Book publishing companies of Denmark